Facundo Queiroz (born 16 March 1998) is a Uruguayan professional footballer who plays for Orense S.C..

References

External links 
 
 

1998 births
Living people
Uruguayan footballers
Association football defenders
Uruguayan expatriate footballers
Expatriate footballers in Belarus
Expatriate footballers in Ecuador
Boston River players
C.A. Bella Vista players
FC Rukh Brest players
FC Minsk players
Colón F.C. players
Delfín S.C. footballers